Mohammadabad-e Sar Haddi (also Romanized as Moḩammadābād-e Sar Ḩaddī and Moḩammadābād-e Sarḩadī; also known as Moḩammadābād-e Seyyed ‘Alī Khān) is a village in Rigan Rural District, in the Central District of Rigan County, Kerman Province, Iran. At the 2006 census, its population was 385, in 87 families.

References 

Populated places in Rigan County